Lawsons Bay Colony is a neighbourhood located in the city of Visakhapatnam state of Andhra Pradesh, India.  It is one of the peaceful and beautiful residential areas in the city.

About
It is located beside MVP Colony and is one of the costliest residential areas in the city, with a beautiful beach newly inaugurated and parks making it one of the best places to live in Visakhapatnam.

Transport
Lawsons Bay Colony is well connected with Sagar Nagar, Dwaraka Nagar, Daba Gardens and Jagadamba Centre.

APSRTC routes

References

Neighbourhoods in Visakhapatnam